Engineer Mohammad Alim Qarar is a member of the Wolesi Jirga for Laghman Province, Afghanistan.
He is an ethnic Pashai.
He was a former commander with the Hezb-e-Islami Gulbuddin militia.

References

Members of the House of the People (Afghanistan)
Living people
Hezb-e Islami Gulbuddin politicians
Year of birth missing (living people)